Geropaschia is a monotypic snout moth genus. Its only species, Geropaschia grisealis, is found in Brazil. The genus was described by George Hampson in 1917 and the species had been described by the same author one year earlier.

References

Epipaschiinae
Monotypic moth genera
Moths of South America
Pyralidae genera